Count Pavel Ivanovich Medem (9 January 1800, Mitava, Courland Governorate - 10 January 1854, Courland) was a Russian diplomat and privy councillor.

Medem held the post of Counsellor of the Embassy in Paris before becoming charge d'affaires in London from 1834 to 1835, envoy in Stuttgart and Darmstadt from 1840 to 1841, and envoy to Austria from 1848 to 1850.

1800 births
1854 deaths
People from Jelgava
People from Courland Governorate
Baltic-German people
Baltic nobility
Ambassadors of the Russian Empire to France
Ambassadors of the Russian Empire to Austria
Ambassadors of the Russian Empire to the United Kingdom
19th-century people from the Russian Empire
Privy Councillor (Russian Empire)